Galgo was a brigantine corvette launched at Ferrol in 1795. On 23 November 1796  was cruising off Grenada when she encountered Galgo and captured her. Galgo was under the command of Don Barber. She was sailing from Porto Rico to Trinidada and was carrying 80,335 dollars and provisions for the government at Trinidada. Alarm took Galgo into Grenada.

Notes, citations, and references
Notes

Citations

References
 

1795 ships
Ships built in Spain
Corvettes of the Spanish Navy
Captured ships